Čovik od svita is a Croatian film directed by Obrad Gluščević, starring Boris Dvornik and Milena Dravić. It was released in 1965.

External links
 

1965 films
1960s Croatian-language films
Yugoslav comedy films
Jadran Film films
Films set in Germany
Croatian black-and-white films